Topolice may refer to the following places in Poland:
Topolice, Lower Silesian Voivodeship (south-west Poland)
Topolice, Łódź Voivodeship (central Poland)